Emporio may refer to:

Emporio (Hamburg), a high-rise office building in Hamburg, Germany
Emporio, Chios, an ancient site in Chios, Greece, whose antiquities are displayed in the Archaeological Museum of Chios
Emporio, Halki, one of two parts of Halki, Greece
Emporio, Kozani, a village in Kozani, Greece
Emporio, Santorini, a village on the island of Santorini, Greece

See also
Emporio Armani, a clothing label of Giorgio Armani
Emporion, ancient name of Empúries, Catalonia, Spain